James Stephens GAA club is a Gaelic Athletic Association club located in Ballina, County Mayo, Ireland. The club was founded in 2005 and is exclusively concerned with the game of hurling.

Honours

 Mayo Senior Hurling Championship (1): 2007

External links
James Stephens GAA site

Gaelic games clubs in County Mayo
Hurling clubs in County Mayo